Eric Himelfarb (born January 1, 1983) is a Canadian professional ice hockey player for HC Thurgau of the NLB.
SCL Tigers Langnau 2017 - 2018

Playing career
Himelfarb was 171st overall pick of the Montreal Canadiens in the 2001 NHL Entry Draft.

Himelfarb signed as a free agent with the Detroit Red Wings on March 30, 2004 and was assigned to the Griffins, their AHL affiliate.  After four seasons in Grand Rapids, Himelfarb signed with HC Lausanne of the Swiss League on May 30, 2007. For the 2008/2009 Season Himelfarb was traded to  EHC Biel in Swiss National League A, the highest division in Swiss Ice Hockey.

On April 23, 2014, Himelfarb left Linköpings HC after two seasons and signed a contract with fellow SHL club, Leksands IF. He played next for the Malmö Redhawks in 2014-16, for Hockey Thurgau in 2016-17, and in 2017-18 for the SCL Tigers, SC Langenthal, and HC La Chaux-de-Fonds.

Personal life
Himelfarb, who is Jewish, was born in Thornhill, Ontario.

Career statistics

See also
List of select Jewish ice hockey players

References

External links

1983 births
Barrie Colts players
EHC Biel players
Canadian ice hockey centres
Grand Rapids Griffins players
Ice hockey people from Ontario
Kingston Frontenacs players
Genève-Servette HC players
SC Langenthal players
Lausanne HC players
Linköping HC players
Living people
Montreal Canadiens draft picks
Rögle BK players
Sarnia Sting players
Jewish ice hockey players
Jewish Canadian sportspeople
Canadian expatriate ice hockey players in Switzerland
Canadian expatriate ice hockey players in Sweden